Portrait of Vitellozzo Vitelli is an oil on panel painting by Luca Signorelli, created c. 1492–1496, now in the Berenson Collection at Villa I Tatti in Settignano (Firenze). It forms a kind of diptych with the same artist's Portrait of Niccolò Vitelli (Barber Institute of Fine Arts), Vitellozzo Vitelli's father - both were produced during the painter's stay in Florence from 1492 to 1496.

References

Paintings by Luca Signorelli
Paintings in the Berenson collection
1496 paintings
15th-century portraits
Portraits of men